Euanthoides is a genus of parasitic flies in the family Tachinidae. There is one described species in Euanthoides, E. petiolata.

Distribution
Mexico, Brazil.

References

Diptera of North America
Diptera of South America
Dexiinae
Tachinidae genera
Taxa named by Charles Henry Tyler Townsend
Monotypic Brachycera genera